Drużyna (Srzeniawa bez Krzyża) is a Polish coat of arms. It was used by several szlachta families in the times of the Kingdom of Poland and the Polish–Lithuanian Commonwealth.

History

Blazon

Notable bearers
Notable bearers of this coat of arms include:

 House of Lubomirski
 Hieronim Augustyn Lubomirski
 Jerzy Sebastian Lubomirski
 Józef Karol Lubomirski
 Stanisław Lubomirski
 Stanisław Herakliusz Lubomirski
 Stanisław Lubomirski (1722-1782)
 Elżbieta Lubomirska
 Stanisław Lubomirski (1583-1649)
 Antoni Benedykt Lubomirski
 Teodor Lubomirski
 Aleksander Michał Lubomirski
 Teresa Lubomirska
 Sebastian Lubomirski
 Katarzyna Lubomirska
 Krystyna Lubomirska (XVII-1645)
 Elżbieta Lubomirska (1669-1729)

Gallery

Related coat of arms 
 Srzeniawa coat of arms

See also
 Polish heraldry
 Heraldic family
 List of Polish nobility coats of arms

Bibliography
 Tadeusz Gajl: Herbarz polski od średniowiecza do XX wieku : ponad 4500 herbów szlacheckich 37 tysięcy nazwisk 55 tysięcy rodów. L&L, 2007, s. 406-539. .
 Kasper Niesiecki, Herbarz, VIII, 468-469

Polish coats of arms
 Coat of arms